Justus Ketchum Smith (March 28, 1922 – November 20, 2013) was an American rower, born in Spokane, who competed at the 1948 Summer Olympics. He won the gold medal with the American team in the coxed eights competition.

References

1922 births
2013 deaths
Sportspeople from Spokane, Washington
American male rowers
Rowers at the 1948 Summer Olympics
Olympic gold medalists for the United States in rowing
Medalists at the 1948 Summer Olympics